An Inspector Calls is a 1954 British drama film directed by Guy Hamilton and starring Alastair Sim, Jane Wenham and Eileen Moore. It is based upon the 1945 play An Inspector Calls by J.B. Priestley and was adapted for the screen by Desmond Davis. It was shot at Shepperton Studios with sets designed by the art director Joseph Bato.

Plot
In 1912, the upper class Birling family sit at a dining table at the end of a dinner party with their friends. Gerald Croft proposes to the daughter, Sheila. Mother chastises Eric, the son, for drinking too much. Father discusses the likelihood of war and after the meal discusses his possible knighthood with Gerald over port and cigars. They are interrupted by a man calling himself Inspector Poole, investigating the suicide of a working-class girl Eva Smith whose death is linked to each family member. Eva has poisoned herself. She left a diary. Eva was one of Mr Birling's workers in his factory.

In a flashback to 1910, we see Eva working in the machine shop in his factory. She goes with a group of women to demand a pay increase from 22/6 to 25/- per week. Birling refuses and tells them to find another job if they are unhappy. Back in the Birling house, the father cannot see what any of this has to do with him. The inspector explains that after a period of unemployment she went to work at Lilworth's but was dismissed after 2 months after a customer complained. It becomes clear that this was Sheila.

In a second flashback, Sheila is trying to choose a hat with her mother. Sheila accuses Eva of being rude for smiling as she struggles to fit the hat and demands she is dismissed.

Sheila explains she was jealous of her looks. The inspector says Eva then changed her name to Daisy Renton, to which Gerald looks shocked. Gerald confesses to Sheila that he had an affair with Daisy beginning in March 1911. He says he met Daisy at the Palace Variety Show and we enter a third flashback in the bar where he tricks the man she was with to leave and takes his seat. He takes her for a meal and, finding she is homeless, lets her use his townhouse and gives her money to survive on. It develops into an affair, but he does not go out with her in public. On one of his visits, she realises that he is building up to breaking off their affair, and, to make things easier for him, tells him they should separate as she realises that he only ever felt sorry for her. She leaves the flat the next day.

It is revealed that Mrs Birling refused Eva charity in her role as chairwoman of a charity committee. The refusal was on the grounds that Eva gave the name Birling and claims her husband left her. She is pregnant. Finally, Eric is shown to have met Eva on a tram. They have an affair and Eva falls pregnant. He steals money to support her, but she refuses it when she realises it was stolen. This is when she goes to Mrs Birling but is turned down. In summary, each person is partially responsible for Eva's death.

Gerald asks a policeman outside and discovers there is no "Inspector Poole" in that town. He goes back into the house to challenge Poole. They send Poole to wait in the library while they discuss it. They all feel partially unburdened of their guilt except Sheila. They decide to turn it all round to avoid a scandal and realise there is no evidence. They also realise the photo of the girl was only shown to one at a time. Gerald phones the infirmary to check the girl is really dead but is told no-one died. It is all a strange scam. Mr and Mrs Birling decide to go back to how they were, though Sheila and Eric are permanently changed.

Then the phone rings. A girl has just died at the infirmary and an inspector is on his way. In the library Poole has vanished.

Cast
Alastair Sim as Inspector Poole
Jane Wenham as Eva Smith/Daisy Renton
Eileen Moore as Sheila Birling
Bryan Forbes as Eric Birling
Brian Worth as Gerald Croft
Olga Lindo as Sybil Birling
Arthur Young as Arthur Birling
Norman Bird as Foreman Jones-Collins
Charles Saynor as Police Sergeant Arnold Ransom
John Welsh as Mr. Timmon: Hat Sales Manager  
Barbara Everest as Mrs. Lefson: Charity Committee Woman  
George Woodbridge as Stanley: Fish & Chips Shop Owner
George Cole as conductor on tram
Olwen Brookes as Miss Frances
Frances Gowens as small girl in the chip shop

Production

An Inspector Calls was filmed at Shepperton Studios, Shepperton, Middlesex, England, under the auspices of the Watergate Productions Ltd.

In the original play, the Inspector's name was Inspector Goole.

Although the play never shows Eva Smith, the film opens in flashbacks that show each member of the family's involvement in Smith's life.

In the play, Eva is first sacked for being involved in a strike; in the film, she is simply sacked for suggesting that the increased wages requested were necessary to live on. Similarly, in the play, Sheila is trying on a dress when the incident with Eva occurs in the shop; in the film, the incident is over a hat.

In the play, the Inspector is ushered in by the maid, while in the film he simply appears suddenly in the dining room as if from nowhere, accompanied by an ominous chord in the background music. In the middle of the film, he inspects his pocket watch and asks Eric to enter the room. He states he has just heard Eric come through the door; however, Eric does come through the door before this.

Reception
C. A. Lejeune, film critic of The Observer, recommended the film; despite its lack of technical polish, its slow pace and often trite dialogue, she found it thought-provoking.

References

External links 
 An Inspector Calls (1954) at the British Film Institute
 
 
 An Inspector Calls (1954) at Free Films Archive

1954 films
British historical films
1950s historical films
1954 crime drama films
1950s mystery films
British mystery films
British crime drama films
British black-and-white films
British films based on plays
Films set in country houses
Films directed by Guy Hamilton
Films based on works by J. B. Priestley
British Lion Films films
Films shot at Shepperton Studios
Films set in the 1910s
1950s English-language films
1950s British films